A fire camp is a campsite for firefighters and support personnel. It is typically set up for a large project fire which requires a large amount of manpower, organisation and logistics.  According to the National Incident Management System (NIMS), a fire camp is one of five predesignated temporary facilities.  Fire camps provide certain essential auxiliary forms of support, such as food, sleeping areas, and sanitation for Wildland firefighters. Fire camps may also provide minor maintenance and servicing of equipment.

While a fire camp is technically separate from the Incident Command Post and Incident Base it is common practice in U.S. wildland firefighting to set up the fire camp at the Incident Command post or Incident Base.  Spike Camps are satellites of the main fire camp, and generally draw their supplies and food from the main camp while providing their own sanitation facilities.  Spike Camps are used to support operation areas that require personnel to travel extended distances to return to the main camp.  They are generally seen as a safety measure to prevent excessive fatigue, and reduce the probability of a collision with a civilian vehicle or stationary object.

See also
 Mobilization and staging area
 Helibase, Helispot and Drop Point
 California fire camps, an example of fire camps staffed by incarcerated firefighters

References

Citations

Sources

Further reading
L.A. County to use fire camps for some long-term jail inmates - Los Angeles Times
Colby Fire: 27 county inmate firefighters assist crews battling Glendora fire
Missing Inmate Who 'Walked Away' From Fire Camp Captured By Authorities | KHTS Radio
Idaho Mountain Express: Department of Lands helped during wildfire - December 24, 2013

Incident management
Firefighting
Wildfire suppression
Wildfires